The 2015 FIFA Women's World Cup qualification UEFA Group 5 was a UEFA qualifying group for the 2015 FIFA Women's World Cup. The group comprised Albania, Belgium, Greece, Netherlands, Norway and Portugal.

The group winners qualified directly for the 2015 FIFA Women's World Cup. Among the seven group runners-up, the four best (determined by records against the first-, third-, fourth- and fifth-placed teams only for balance between different groups) advanced to the play-offs. The winner of the group was Norway, with Netherlands proceeding to the play-offs.

Standings

Results
All times are CEST (UTC+02:00) during summer and CET (UTC+01:00) during winter.

Goalscorers
13 goals
 Vivianne Miedema

12 goals
 Aline Zeler

10 goals
 Tessa Wullaert

9 goals
 Renée Slegers

8 goals
 Caroline Graham Hansen

6 goals
 Isabell Herlovsen

5 goals

 Manon Melis
 Ada Hegerberg
 Maren Mjelde

4 goals

 Lieke Martens
 Kristine Wigdahl Hegland
 Elise Thorsnes

3 goals

 Lien Mermans
 Mandy van den Berg
 Laura Luís
 Carolina Mendes
 Jéssica Silva

2 goals

 Tinne De Caigny
 Lorca Van De Putte
 Sophia Koggouli
 Eshly Bakker
 Anouk Dekker
 Emilie Haavi
 Ingvild Stensland
 Vanessa Rodrigues

1 goal

 Albina Rrahmani
 Aurora Serenaj
 Furtuna Velaj
 Janice Cayman
 Maud Coutereels
 Cécile de Gernier
 Davina Philtjens
 Elke Van Gorp
 Sofia Pelekouda
 Christina Kokoviadou
 Dimitra Panteliadou
 Tessel Middag
 Sherida Spitse
 Daniëlle van de Donk
 Claudia van den Heiligenberg
 Nora Holstad Berge
 Melissa Bjånesøy
 Marit Fiane Christensen
 Ida Elise Enget
 Solveig Gulbrandsen
 Carole Costa
 Edite Fernandes
 Cristiana Garcia
 Vanessa Malho
 Mónica Mendes
 Cláudia Neto
 Regina Pereira

1 own goal
 Lucie Gjini (playing against the Netherlands)
 Ezmiralda Franja (playing against Greece)
 Efrosini Xera (playing against Portugal)

References

External links
Women's World Cup – Qualifying round Group 5, UEFA.com

Group 5
2013 in Norwegian women's football
2014 in Norwegian women's football
2013–14 in Dutch women's football
2014–15 in Dutch women's football
Qual
2013–14 in Belgian football
2014–15 in Belgian football
2013–14 in Greek football
2014–15 in Greek football
2013–14 in Portuguese women's football
2014–15 in Portuguese women's football
2013–14 in Albanian football
2014–15 in Albanian football
Qual